John L. Smith (born 1948) is an American football coach.

John L. Smith may also refer to:
 J. Lawrence Smith (chemist) (1818–1883), American physician & chemist
J. Lawrence Smith (New York politician) (1816–1889), New York lawyer, assemblyman, district attorney, county judge
 John L. Smith (pharmaceutical executive) (1889–1950), German-born American chemist, pharmaceutical executive, and co-owner of the Brooklyn Dodgers
 John Lee Smith (1894–1963), Lieutenant Governor of Texas
 John Smith (flying ace) (John Lucian Smith, 1914–1972), American fighter pilot
 John Smith (Conservative politician) (Sir John Lindsay Eric Smith, 1923–2007), British politician
 Jack Smith (lawyer) (born c. 1968), formally John L. Smith, American lawyer and special counsel

See also
 John Smith (disambiguation)